Harold J. Rhyne (March 30, 1899 – January 7, 1971) was an American professional baseball infielder. He played in Major League Baseball (MLB) from 1926 through 1933 for the Pittsburgh Pirates, Boston Red Sox, and Chicago White Sox.

In a seven-season career, Rhyne was a .250 hitter (508-for-2031) with two home runs and 192 RBI in 655 games, including 252 runs, 98 doubles, 22 triple, and 13 stolen bases.

Rhyne's minor league career spanned twenty seasons, between 1921 and 1940. After starting his career with the Des Moines Boosters, he joined the San Francisco Seals of the Pacific Coast League. With the exception of the seasons he spent in the majors, he played for the Seals until 1938, when he joined the Tacoma Tigers of the Western International League partway through the season. He played for the Tigers through the end of his professional playing career.

Rhyne is one of only two major leaguers to have been born in Paso Robles, CA. The other is Jason Botts. He died at the age of 71 in Orangevale, California and is buried in Sacramento City Cemetery in Sacramento, California.  He has a small, plain headstone.

Notes

External links

Retrosheet

Boston Red Sox players
Chicago White Sox players
Pittsburgh Pirates players
Major League Baseball shortstops
Baseball players from California
1899 births
1971 deaths